HMSAS Bloemfontein was an  built for the Royal Navy in Canada during World War II. The ship was originally named Rosamund (pennant number: J439) and spent several years clearing minefields in Europe after she was completed in 1945 before she was placed in reserve. Rosamund was purchased by South Africa in 1947 and later renamed HMSAS Bloemfontein.

The ship spent most of its early career in the South African Navy training or making good-will visits to foreign countries. She was laid up in the late 1950s and was recommissioned in 1961 to serve as an interim training ship until the shore-based training establishment then under construction was completed. This occurred in 1963 and Bloemfontein returned briefly to reserve before she was deemed surplus to requirements. The ship was sunk as a target in 1967.

Description 
She was powered by a pair of vertical triple-expansion steam engines, each driving one propeller shaft, using steam provided by two Admiralty three-drum boilers. The ship was armed with a single four-inch (102 mm) Mk V dual-purpose gun and two twin and two single mounts for Oerlikon  light anti-aircraft (AA) guns. For anti-submarine work, Bloemfontein was fitted with two depth charge rails, and four depth charge throwers for 92 depth charges. The ship was also equipped with a Type 271 surface-search radar and a Type 291 air-search radar. Her crew numbered 85 officers and ratings.

Construction and career
Bloemfontein was ordered on 15 March 1943 from the Port Arthur Shipbuilding Company of Port Arthur, Ontario, Canada, and laid down on 26 April 1944 with the name of Rosamund. The ship was the first of her name to serve in the Royal Navy. She was launched on 20 December and completed six months later on 10 July 1945. The ship was assigned to clear the coastal waters of Western Europe of minefields laid during the war and did so until she was laid up in 1947 at Devonport Royal Dockyard. Rosamund was purchased by the South African Navy later that year, together with her sister ship, . The sisters departed England on 22 November after a refresher course at the minesweeping school at HMS Lochinvar, Port Edgar, Scotland. They arrived at Cape Town on 24 December, making stops at Gibraltar, Freetown and Walvis Bay en route.

Rosamund was rechristened as Bloemfontein in East London during that city's centenary celebrations in mid-1948. In August she made her first supply run to Marion Island. In November of that year, the sisters exercised with the British 3rd Aircraft Carrier Squadron. Later that month, together with the frigate , they visited ports in Portuguese Mozambique, returning to Durban on 12 December. The sisters were placed in reserve in the late 1950s, after the navy had purchased 10 s. Bloemfontein was recommissioned in April 1961 to serve as a stationary training ship in Simon's Town until the navy's training facility SAS Simonsberg was completed in July 1963. The navy decided that the ship was no longer needed and she was stripped of useful equipment before being sunk as a target in False Bay by the frigate  and the minesweeper  on 5 June 1967.

Citations

References

External links
 HMS Rosamund at uboat.net
 Flag-showing cruises of the South African Navy 
 Dive site article for the SAS Bloemfontein on Wikivoyage

Algerine-class minesweepers of the Royal Navy
1944 ships
World War II minesweepers of the United Kingdom
Algerine-class minesweepers of the South African Navy
Ships built in Ontario
Maritime incidents in 1967
Ships sunk as targets
Shipwrecks of South Africa